Lido Beach is a beach in Somalia's capital, Mogadishu, which overlooks the Somali Sea. The name Lido derives from the Italian word for "beach". The name Liido is also very popular among locals.

History

The beach in northern Mogadishu was initially developed in the late 1930s for the Italian colonists living in the capital of Italian Somalia.

In the 1950s, it was fully developed by the Italian administration under United Nations rule, with the enlargement of a nearby hotel that was Mogadishu's tallest building during those years.

After decades of civil war and anarchy in the capital, the beach fell into disuse. However, it has experienced a revival in the last decade.

Al-Shabaab attacks
In January 2016, al-Shabaab carried out a suicide car bombing and mass shooting at a restaurant, killing about 20 people.

In August 2020, al-Shabaab attacked a hotel, detonating a car bomb and engaging in a firefight with Somali security forces. Eleven victims and five attackers were killed; over 200 people were rescued by Somali special forces. The United Nations Secretary-General’s Special Representative for Somalia, James Swan, strongly condemned the terrorist attack and said the UN "expressed its deepest condolences to the families of the victims."

In April 2022, a restaurant was attacked by an al-Shabaab suicide bomber.

Present
Many people visit Mogadishu's coastline each weekend. Somalia has the longest coastline in mainland Africa with 3100 km along the Indian Ocean, which has beaches valuable for tourism. Lido Beach has seafood restaurants, hotels, and parks. The Somali diaspora plays an important role in recovering Mogadishu, building new luxury downtown and beaches and restaurants, and many more that attract international tourists. There are many newly established businesses there.

See also
 Jazeera Beach

Notes

Beaches of Mogadishu